Muran is a 2011 Indian Tamil-language action thriller film written and directed by debutant Rajan Madhav. It stars Cheran alongside Prasanna, with Haripriya, Nikita Thukral and Jayaprakash in pivotal roles. Launched in September 2010, the film's shooting was completed by July 2011. The story revolves around two contrasting characters and depicts the incidents that occur when they meet each other. The film is highly inspired by Alfred Hitchcock's psychological thriller Strangers on a Train (1951). Co-produced and distributed by UTV Motion Pictures, Muran was released on 30 September 2011 to overall positive reviews.

Plot 
The film starts with the scene in a hotel in Bangalore, where Nanda (Cheran) is playing a song on his guitar for producers who are helping him get an opportunity in Tamil cinema as a musician. At this instant, Arjun (Prasanna), heavily drunk, makes a scene, stating that he will fall from there (the top floor of the hotel) to the swimming pool at the ground, and he does.

While returning to Chennai, Nanda's car engine gets seized due to the sudden brake made in order to avoid collision with another car driven by arrogant drunken youngsters. Arjun, who drove alone to Chennai, gives a lift to Nanda in his car. They both get introduced, and they identify that both of them had many differences in opinion. They both share their tragic stories of their life while travelling. Nanda tells him about his unloving wife Indhu (Nikita Thukral), and his post marital love Lavanya (Haripriya). He states he lives in a situation that he uncomfortably living adjusted life with his wife.
Then, Arjun tells Nanda about his materialistic father, Devarajan (Jayaprakash), a famous industrialist and business magnate, asking him to continue his business and follow his ideas even though he doesn't like it. Moreover, tragedy occurs when Devarajan raped Arjun's lady love Linda (Suma Bhattacharya), who worked in Devarajan's office. Linda commits suicide as her chastity was destroyed by her "future" father-in-law.

Arjun lives his life in the shadow of his father to keep the promise to his love that he made before she died.

After some time of travelling, both of them meet the youngsters who were responsible for Nanda's car seize in a motel. Arjun initiates a fight with them, and Nanda joins to help Arjun. Finally, while escaping in their car, both of them chase and make the same thing happen to Nanda's car. Afterwards, while approaching the destination of their journey, Arjun explains to Nanda his idea of solving both of their problems in a criss-cross manner. The plan calls for Arjun to kill Nanda's wife and for Nanda to kill Arjun's father. Arjun explains that no one can solve the murder, as Arjun and Nanda are strangers and no motive can be determined by the police and outsiders. Arjun explains as both of them are strangers, if he kills Nanda's wife in a situation that appears to be an accident while Nanda is officially engaged in another place, nothing can be traced. Nanda immediately turns down the deal and leaves.

In a week's daily routine, Nanda increasingly identifies with Arjun's idea that the only problem in his life is his wife. After a week's time, his wife is involved in an accident on the highway and dies on the spot. The next day, Arjun comes to Nanda's home and describes how he created the accident and how he found out Indhu had been unfaithful to Nanda by having an affair with her colleague named Gowtham. Arjun asks Nanda to complete his part of the plan by murdering his dad and explains he had another plan for him. Both of them meet frequently at locations where no one can see them together, and both of them are officially unconnected strangers to the world. Nanda explains he can't murder anyone. Arjun forces him to go through with it by saying that his dad was an evil human and the only way for him to have a happy life is for his father to die. Meanwhile, a policeman and a relative of Indhu suspects that Nanda arranged for Indhu's accident by hiring a hitman, as Nanda started living happily together with his love. The policeman's suspicions cause him to become Arjun's next target.

Arjun kills him, and the news reports that the policeman was killed due to an electrical leak in his home.

Nanda understands that Arjun is already highly engaged in the deal and won't stop until he accepts it. So he agrees to murder Arjun's dad while convincing himself that he is doing it for the greater good. Arjun provides the plan to Nanda and leaves of the city to establish an alibi while the murder occurs. Nanda follows Devarajan to execute the plan, finding that Devarajan is a good and kind human, and withdraws his murder plan. The following day, Arjun calls him to ask why he failed, and ask to meet with him. In the shopping mall where he had planned to meet with Arjun, Nanda runs into his lover's friend. She casually explains the evil nature of Arjun when she sees Arjun. She explains how Arjun caused Linda's suicide by breaking up with her. Nanda understood Arjun had painted a self heroic story and how he betrayed him. Nanda explains to Arjun that he won't do anything for him as he knows the truth and asks to get far away from him forever. Arjun seems to finally accept Nanda's refusal – but warns him that accidents can happen at any time.

Over the next few days, Nanda feels increasingly alarmed by accidents threatening Lavanya's safety, realizing Arjun is behind them all. Lavanya is confused about what was happening to Nanda and believes that he was going mad. Arjun hears Lavanya telling her friend about Nanda and informs Nanda that he is still active and he can kill Lavanya too. Nanda finally makes his decision and tells Arjun that he is ready to murder Devarajan. Arjun lays his plan and goes to Bangalore. Meanwhile, Nanda breaks into the hotel in Bangalore where Arjun is staying and tells him that he is going to kill him instead of his dad. Arjun fights back, and falls from the roof near the swimming pool, into which he dives at the start of the film. Hotel authorities report the case as the drunken jump from a roof. He dies instantly, and Nanda is satisfied that he didn't have to pull the trigger to kill Arjun as he had initially planned.

Cast

Soundtrack 
Music composed by Sajan Madhav.

Critical reception 
Sify enthusiastically rated it 'Very good' and called it an "engaging thriller." Behindwoods called it a "thriller well told!" Rohit Ramachandran of Nowrunning.com added the film to his 'Best of 2011' list. On the contrary, Pavithra Srinivasan of Rediff rated it 2.5/5 complaining that it was heavily inspired

References

External links 
 

2010s Tamil-language films
2011 action thriller films
2011 directorial debut films
2011 films
Films based on American novels
Films based on works by Patricia Highsmith
Indian action thriller films
UTV Motion Pictures films